Sara Ristovska (born 9 September 1996) is a Macedonian handball player who plays for CSKA Moscow and the North Macedonian national handball team.

She represented the North Macedonia at the 2022 European Women's Handball Championship.

References

Externel links 

1996 births
Macedonian female handball players
Sportspeople from Skopje
Living people
Mediterranean Games competitors for North Macedonia
Competitors at the 2018 Mediterranean Games